Galveston Airport  is a public-use airport in unincorporated Cass County, Indiana, United States. The airport is located three nautical miles (6 km) northwest of the central business district of Galveston, Indiana.

Facilities
It has one runway designated 18/36 with a turf surface measuring 2,720 by 75 feet (829 x 23 m).

References

External links

Airports in Indiana
Transportation buildings and structures in Cass County, Indiana